Seebach may refer to:

Places
Seebach, Baden-Württemberg, a town in the district of Ortenau in Baden-Württemberg in Germany
Seebach, Wartburgkreis, a municipality in the Wartburgkreis district in Thuringia in Germany
Seebach, Mühlhausen, a quarter of the town of Mühlhausen in Thuringia in Germany
Seebach, Bas-Rhin, a municipality in the Département Bas-Rhin in France
Seebach (Zürich), a quarter of the city of Zürich in Switzerland

Rivers
Seebach (Unstrut), of Thuringia, Germany, tributary of the Unstrut
Seebach (Usa), of Hesse, Germany, tributary of the Usa
Seebach (Ismaning), of Bavaria, Germany, in Ismaning, tributary of the Isar
Seebach (Laufach), of Bavaria, Germany, headwater of the Laufach
Seebach (Regnitz), of Bavaria, Germany, tributary of the Rhine–Main–Danube Canal
Obernberger Seebach, of Tyrol, Austria

People
Dieter Seebach (born 1937), German chemist
Holger Seebach (1922–2011), Danish footballer
Karl Seebach (1912–2007), German mathematician
Karl von Seebach (1839–1880), German geologist
Lothar von Seebach (1853–1930), Alsatian painter, designer, watercolorist and engraver
Marie Seebach (1829–1897), German actress
Nicolai Seebach (born 1977), Danish songwriter and music producer
Tommy Seebach (1949–2003), Danish musician
Rasmus Seebach (born 1980), Danish musician, son of Tommy Seebach
Rasmus Seebach (album), the debut album of Rasmus Seebach